Jan Snedeker (c. 1608 – c. 1685) arrived in New Amsterdam, in the New Netherland colony, around 1639. In 1652 he came to be one of the three founders of Middelwout, or Midwout (Flatbush), a name deriving from the Middle Dutch word meaning "middle woods," so called for the area of dense woodland midway between the towns of Breuckelen (Brooklyn) and Amersfoort (Flatlands).

References

17th-century births
17th-century deaths
People from New York (state)